Cao Zhijie (Chinese:曹志杰; born 7 January 1983) is a Chinese football player.

On 2 July 2009, Cao made his first and only appearance in the Chinese Super League in a 0–0 away draw against Qingdao Jonoon.

Career statistics
Statistics accurate as of match played 1 January 2010.

Honours
Guangzhou Pharmaceutical
China League One: 2007

References

External links
 Player profile at sohu.com (Chinese)

1983 births
Living people
Chinese footballers
Chinese Super League players
China League One players
Guangzhou F.C. players
Footballers from Guangzhou
Expatriate footballers in Macau
Association football midfielders
21st-century Chinese people